Sir Charles Du Cane  (5 December 1825 – 25 February 1889) was a British Conservative Party politician and colonial administrator who was a Member of Parliament between 1852 and 1854 and Governor of Tasmania from 1868 to 1874.

Du Cane was born in Ryde on the Isle of Wight in 1825, the son of Charles Du Cane of Braxted Park and Frances Prideaux-Brune. He was educated at Charterhouse School in Surrey and Exeter College, Oxford. From 1848 to 1855, Du Cane played first-class cricket for the Marylebone Cricket Club as a batsman; a younger brother, Alfred, also played first-class cricket.

In 1852, he was elected to the House of Commons as a Member of Parliament (MP) for Maldon in Essex, but his election was declared void after it was discovered that Du Cane's agents had been involved in bribery although it was established that Du Cane was unaware of the corruption. He spent two years as Civil Lord of the Admiralty.  At the 1857 general election he was elected as MP for Northern Essex, and held the seat until the division was abolished at the 1868 general election.

Du Cane was appointed Governor of Tasmania, and was sworn in at Hobart Town on 15 January 1869. He faced a minor constitutional crisis when the Premier of Tasmania, James Milne Wilson, threatened to resign after a taxation scheme he had proposed was defeated in parliament, which would have left Tasmania without a government, although Wilson withdrew his resignation and a general election took place.

Du Cane's tenure in Tasmania saw the colony grow strong and prosperous, partly due to industrial and resources booms and the improvement of communication between Tasmania, the mainland and England. He left Hobart in November 1874, and was appointed KCMG the next year after his return to England. Du Cane died at his family estate in Braxted Park, Essex on 25 February 1889, survived by five children, including the artist Ella Du Cane.

See also 
 English translations of Homer: Charles Du Cane

References

External links 
 

1825 births
1889 deaths
People educated at Charterhouse School
Governors of Tasmania
Lords of the Admiralty
Knights Commander of the Order of St Michael and St George
Marylebone Cricket Club cricketers
People from Ryde
Conservative Party (UK) MPs for English constituencies
UK MPs 1852–1857
UK MPs 1857–1859
UK MPs 1859–1865
UK MPs 1865–1868
English cricketers
Gentlemen of England cricketers
Colony of Tasmania people
Members of Parliament for Maldon